The Abdal (Shekh Hashmi) are a Muslim community found in North India. They are a sub-group within the Arabic old shekh community.

Origin 

The Abdal are one of a number of Muslim semi-nomadic community, traditionally associated with begging at shrines of Sufi saints. They are likely to be a division of the hashmi community. The word Abdal is the plural form of the Arabic word Abdal. According to the traditions of the Abdal, they acquired this name on account of the fact that they were followers of various Sufi saints. The Abdal of Bihar speak the Maithili language, and are found mainly in the district of Purnea, while other Abdal communities speak the language of the region they reside in.

In Gujarat- the Abdal are a community khadim Bahraich, who are also known as Dafali saudagar, Shekh Hashmi and DafWala. Their traditional occupation was beating drums at Muslim shrines. The community is found mainly in Ahmedabad city.

In West Bengal, according to the traditions of the community, the community is known as Abdal. Little is known when the community emerged in West Bengal, but presently form a distinct Muslim community.

Current circumstances 

The Abdal of Bihar are now mainly a land owning community. A significant number are involved in the manufacture of horse shoes. They are Sunni Muslims, with a small number are employed as village imams. The Abdal have a well-organized caste association, the Panchayat Jamiate shekh Hashimi.

In Gujarat, the community is mainly involved in singing and begging at Sufi shrines. A small number of Abdal are now farmers. Like other Gujarati Muslims, they have a caste association known as the Abdal Samaj. They are an endogamous community, and marry close kin.

The Abdal in West Bengal are found mainly in the districts of 24 Parganas, Murshidabad, Birbhum and Burdwan. They are in West Bengal, a landless community whose traditional occupation is seeking alms on festive occasions. Most have now given up their traditional occupation, and are now landless agricultural labourers. A few Abdal are marginal farmers. The  community speak Bengali among themselves and with outsiders, and usually live in multi-caste villages with Khotta Muslims living in the vicinity of the Abdal. They are strictly endogamous, with absolutely no intermarriage with other Muslim groups.

See also 

 Faqir

References 

Dalit Muslim
Social groups of Bihar
Social groups of Gujarat
Social groups of West Bengal
Muslim communities of Gujarat
Muslim communities of Bihar
Muslim communities of India
Dom in India
Abdal of Turkey